Nabil Yaâlaoui (born May 1, 1987 in Maghnia) is an Algerian footballer who is currently playing for USM Annaba in the Algerian Ligue Professionnelle 2.

Club career

JS Kabylie
On June 6, 2010, Yaâlaoui signed a one-year contract with JS Kabylie. On September 19, 2010, Yaâlaoui scored a goal against Nigerian club Heartland in the group stage of the 2010 CAF Champions League. A week later, in his first league game for the club, on September 25, 2010, he scored a goal in a 3–2 win over AS Khroub.

MC Alger
On July 28, 2011, Yaâlaoui signed a one-year contract with MC Alger.

Honours
Won the Algerian Championnat National 2 once with WA Tlemcen in 2009
Won the Algerian Cup once with JS Kabylie in 2011

References

External links
DZFoot.com Profile

1987 births
Living people
Algerian footballers
IRB Maghnia players
JS Kabylie players
MC Alger players
WA Tlemcen players
RC Relizane players
MC Oran players
Algerian Ligue Professionnelle 1 players
People from Maghnia
Association football midfielders
21st-century Algerian people